Gloria Aura Bortolini (born January 27, 1982) is an Italian television presenter and documentary filmmaker.

Early life and education
Bortolini was born in Treviso, Italy. She graduated from Pompeu Fabra University in 2007 with a degree in economics and a master’s degree in marketing and communication.

Career
Following graduation, she worked as a journalist. After two years in Brazil and Argentina, she moved to London. Her 2015 film, London afloat, was shown at several film festivals. 

She hosted a television series, Londra, linea Greenwich, a program about London's fashion scene, on Kilimangiaro - Come è piccolo il mondo for RAI 3. She presented a vlog, Glorious Postcards, on YouTube.

One of Bortolini’s photographs won an award in 2013 at the Sony World Photography Awards.

Works

Filmography

 The two stories of Adamà (2010) ( assistant director)
 Non ho paura ( 2010) ( camera assistant)
 The lane ( 2011) (director) 
 Autrefois (2012) (assistant director, producer)
 Luoghi comuni, little migrating stories (2013) (Video journalist) 
 The daily Lidia ( 2013) (second camera) 
 Leoni (2013) (assistant director) 
 Lei è mio marito – she is my husband (2013) ( co-director,co-author) 
 Alle falde del Kilimangiaro (2014) (author, TV presenter) 
 Facing (2015) (researcher, co-author) 
 Metropolis, Travel Channel (2015) (TV presenter) 
 London afloat (2015) (director, author)
 (con)fine (2016) (director, author)
 Out of the blue (2016) (director)

Photography

 1 day 6 cities (2011) 
 è Africa (2013) 
 East end, photobook (2013)
 Press Freedom (2015)

Writing

 Malta, Capital (2011) 
 Pernambuco, Il Mondo (2011) 
 Argentina, Il Mondo (2011) 
 Brazil, fDi Financial Times (2011)

References

External links
 Official website
 Zealous – Freedom of press photo project
 Facing, Fabrica  
1 day 6 cities 
 Londra, Linea Greenwich Kilimangiaro RAI 

 Cervello di ritorno. Succede Oggi
   
  
   
  
    
"Londra, storie di vita in una casa galleggiante". L'espresso. October 6, 2014

Italian documentary filmmakers
People from Treviso
Living people
1982 births
Pompeu Fabra University alumni